Abacoproeces is a genus of  dwarf spiders that was first described by Eugène Louis Simon in 1884.  it contains two species: A. molestus and A. saltuum.

See also
 List of Linyphiidae species

References

Araneomorphae genera
Linyphiidae
Palearctic spiders
Spiders of Asia